Dorstenia brevipetiolata is a plant species of in the family Moraceae which is native to eastern Brazil.  It is only known from a single collection made in April, 1839.

References

brevipetiolata
Plants described in 1985
Flora of Brazil